Michał Płonka (born 8 October 1992) is a Polish professional footballer who plays as a central midfielder for Polonia Bytom.

Club career
In the 2011–12 Ekstraklasa season he was capped three times for Górnik Zabrze, making his debut in a 4–1 victory over Zagłębie Lubin.

On 27 February 2013 he was loaned to Zawisza Bydgoszcz. In June 2019, he became a player of Stal Stalowa Wola, signing a two-year contract. On 3 February 2021, his contract with Stal was terminated. Just two days later, he signed a half-year deal with III liga club Polonia Bytom.

References

External links
 

1992 births
Living people
People from Knurów
Polish footballers
Association football midfielders
Ekstraklasa players
I liga players
II liga players
III liga players
Górnik Zabrze players
Zawisza Bydgoszcz players
Legionovia Legionowo players
Rozwój Katowice players
Stal Stalowa Wola players
Polonia Bytom players
Sportspeople from Silesian Voivodeship
KS ROW 1964 Rybnik players